United States of Colombia was the name adopted in 1863 by the  for the Granadine Confederation, after years of civil war.  Colombia became a federal state itself composed of nine "sovereign states.”  It comprised the present-day nations of Colombia and Panama and parts of northwestern Brazil. After several more years of intermittent civil wars, it was replaced by the more centralist Republic of Colombia in 1886, predecessor to modern Colombia.

History
The civil war of 1860-1862 resulted in the dissolution of the Granadine Confederation which had been subjected increasingly to efforts by conservatives to centralize rule over the federal states.  The liberal General Tomás Cipriano de Mosquera defeated the conservative government of President Bartolomé Calvo during 1862 and was installed as new president. Much power was distributed back to the states from the government in Bogotá.

Colombian Constitution of 1863

It established a federal system with a central presidency with a term of two years and without the possibility of immediate re-election. The president was elected by the states. On 12 May, Mosquera was chosen to be the first president.

The liberals attempted to establish the United States of Colombia with a decentralized, free market system.  As with previous liberal presidencies, such as Mosquera's first two terms as president, a tough policy towards the Catholic Church was taken, much to the dismay of conservatives. Land possessed by the Church was seized and transferred to industrialists and the influence and rights of the Church was limited severely.

During 1871, attempts at modernization and economic reform resulted in the Colombian peso being associated with the French franc as part of the international gold standard.

Abolition
After several years of intermittent civil wars, during 1886 the Colombian Conservative Party directed by President Rafael Núñez proclaimed a new constitution of centralist character that abolished the United States of Colombia and created the Republic of Colombia. The conservatives immediately withdrew Colombia from the gold standard and the subsequent increase of printed currency resulted in troubling inflation.

Meanwhile, the new state would continue to be plagued by conflict between liberal and conservative factions, which eventually would result in the secession of Panama during 1903.

States

The nine original states that formed the confederation were:
 Antioquia State,
 Bolívar State,
 Boyacá State,
 Cauca State,
 Cundinamarca State,
 Magdalena State,
 Panamá State,
 Santander State and
 Tolima State,
and the territories were:
 Caquetá Territory,
 San Martin Territory and
 Nevada and Motilones Territory.

References

History of Colombia
19th century in Colombia
1863 establishments in South America
1886 disestablishments in South America